Rudika Vida (born 12 January 1963) is a Croatian retired footballer who played mostly for clubs based in Slavonia.

During his playing days he was known as prolific striker, especially during 1993–94 season when he scored 26 goals.

Personal life
He is the father of the football players Domagoj Vida and Hrvoje Vida.

References

External links
 Article at 24sata.hr
 
 Stats for 1988/89 season

1963 births
Living people
Association football forwards
Yugoslav footballers
Croatian footballers
NK Osijek players
NK Belišće players
Croatian Football League players